USS W. F. Bartlett was a schooner acquired by the United States Navy in 1861.

W. L. Bartlett was a wooden-hulled Chesapeake Bay schooner acquired by the U.S. Navy on 13 August 1861 at Baltimore, Maryland. The Navy planned to use W. L. Bartlett and 21 other similar craft as blockships at entrances to inlets leading to the North Carolina sounds. The project — the U.S. Navy's first "stone fleet" venture -— ultimately failed.

No record of W. L. Bartletts ultimate fate has been found.

References
 

Schooners of the United States Navy
Ships of the Stone Fleet